Perityle incana, is a species of flowering plant in the family Asteraceae.

References

Perityleae